The Taewon Jang clan is one of the Korean clans. Their Bon-gwan is in Taiyuan, Shanxi, China. Their founder was  who was a Jang Geun’s child. Jang Geun worked as Geochang Governor (居昌縣監) during the 21 th year of Myeongjong of Joseon’s reign in Joseon. The Taewon Jhang clan and Longxi Chang clan in China have the same roots. However, there have been no detailed historical documents yet, therefore it is not clear when the Taewon Jang clan came to Korea.

See also 
 Korean clan names of foreign origin

References

External links 
 

Korean clan names of Chinese origin

Jang clans